The 24th Los Angeles Film Critics Association Awards, honoring the best in film for 1998, were voted on in December 1998. The awards were presented Jan. 20 1999 at the Bel Age Hotel.

Winners
Best Picture:
Saving Private Ryan
Runner-up: The Butcher Boy
Best Director:
Steven Spielberg – Saving Private Ryan
Runner-up: John Boorman – The General
Best Actor:
Ian McKellen – Gods and Monsters
Runner-up: Nick Nolte – Affliction
Best Actress (tie):
Fernanda Montenegro – Central Station (Central do Brasil)
Ally Sheedy – High Art
Best Supporting Actor (tie):
Bill Murray – Rushmore and Wild Things
Billy Bob Thornton – A Simple Plan
Best Supporting Actress:
Joan Allen – Pleasantville
Runner-up: Kathy Bates – Primary Colors
Best Screenplay:
Warren Beatty and Jeremy Pikser – Bulworth
Runner-up: Marc Norman and Tom Stoppard – Shakespeare in Love
Best Cinematography:
Janusz Kamiński – Saving Private Ryan
Runner-up: Seamus Deasy – The General
Best Production Design:
Jeannine Oppewall – Pleasantville
Runner-up: Dennis Gassner – The Truman Show
Best Music Score:
Elliot Goldenthal – The Butcher Boy
Runner-up: Carter Burwell – Gods and Monsters
Best Foreign-Language Film:
The Celebration (Festen) • Denmark/Sweden
Runner-up: Central Station (Central do Brasil) • Brazil/France
Best Non-Fiction Film:
The Farm: Angola, USA
Runner-up: Public Housing 
Best Animation:
A Bug's Life (feature)
T.R.A.N.S.I.T. (short) 
The Douglas Edwards Experimental/Independent Film/Video Award:
Elisabeth Subrin – Shulie
New Generation Award:
Wes Anderson – Rushmore
Career Achievement Award:
Julius J. Epstein
Abraham Polonsky
Special Citation:
Rick Schmidlin, Walter Murch, Jonathan Rosenbaum and Bob O'Neil for the restoration of Orson Welles's Touch of Evil
Barbara Zicka Smith for her work running the American Cinemateque

References

External links
24th Annual Los Angeles Film Critics Association Awards

1998
Los Angeles Film Critics Association Awards
Los Angeles Film Critics Association Awards
Los Angeles Film Critics Association Awards
Los Angeles Film Critics Association Awards